U-39 may refer to one of the following German submarines:

 , was a Type U 31 submarine launched in 1914 and that served in the First World War until interned in Spain on 18 May 1918; surrendered to France on 22 March 1919
 During the First World War, Germany also had these submarines with similar names:
 , a Type UB II submarine launched in 1916 and sunk on 7 May 1917
 , a Type UC II submarine launched in 1916 and sunk 8 February 1917
 , was a Type IX submarine and the first U-Boat to be sunk during the Second World War on 14 September 1939.

Submarines of Germany